The 1999–2000 season of Segunda División B of Spanish football started August 1999 and ended May 2000.

Summary before the 1999–2000 season 
Playoffs de Ascenso:

 Getafe (P) 
 Universidad de Las Palmas
 Real Madrid B
 Racing de Ferrol
 Cultural Leonesa
 Bermeo 
 Barakaldo
 Burgos
 Levante (P)  
 Cartagonova  
 Elche (P) 
 Murcia
 Melilla 
 Sevilla B 
 Córdoba (P)  
 Polideportivo Almería

Relegated from Segunda División:

 Mallorca B
 Barcelona B
 Hércules
 Ourense

Promoted from Tercera División:

 Alavés B (from Group 4)
 Real Unión (from Group 4)
 Premià (from Group 5)
 Novelda (from Group 6)
 Alzira (from Group 6)
 Zamora (from Group 8)
 Gimnástica Segoviana (from Group 8)
 Ponferradina (from Group 8)
 Real Ávila (from Group 8)
 Guadix (from Group 9)
 Linense (from Group 10)
 Dos Hermanas (from Group 10)
 Coria (from Group 10)
 Lanzarote (from Group 12)
 Lorca (from Group 13)
 Izarra (from Group 15)
 Figueruelas (from Group 16)

Relegated:

 Deportivo de La Coruña B
 Langreo
 Lalín
 Lealtad
 Noja
 Lemona
 Tropezón
 Elgoibar
 Espanyol B
 Benidorm
 Palamós
 Gavà
 Plasencia
 Almería
 Moralo
 Isla Cristina
 Algeciras

Group I
Teams from Asturias, Canary Islands, Castile and León, Community of Madrid and Galicia.

Teams

League table

Results

Top goalscorers

Top goalkeepers

Group II
Teams from Aragon, Basque Country, Cantabria, Castile and León, Castilla–La Mancha, La Rioja and Navarre.

Teams

League Table

Results

Top goalscorers

Top goalkeepers

Group III
Teams from Balearic Islands, Catalonia, Region of Murcia and Valencian Community.

Teams

League Table

Results

Top goalscorers

Top goalkeepers

Group IV
Teams from Andalusia, Castilla–La Mancha, Ceuta, Extremadura, Melilla and Region of Murcia.

Teams

League Table

1. Manchego was dissolved at the end of season.

Results

Top goalscorers

Top goalkeepers

Play-offs

Group A

Group B

Group C

Group D

Play-out

Semifinal

Final

External links
Futbolme.com

 
Segunda División B seasons

3
Spain